Mountain Top is an unincorporated area and census-designated place (CDP) in Luzerne County, Pennsylvania, United States. As of the 2010 census, the CDP population was 10,982.

The Mountain Top CDP is located along Pennsylvania Route 309 (south of Wilkes-Barre) in Fairview, Wright,Rice townships and Dorrance Township.

Name
The area's name is properly spelled "Mountain Top". The United States Postal Service uses the spelling "Mountain Top" for ZIP Code 18707, and the Pennsylvania Department of Transportation spells it "Mountain Top" on a Pennsylvania driver's license. However, some businesses in Mountain Top spell their community as a single word, "Mountaintop".

Geography

Mountain Top, once named "Penobscot", is located in central Luzerne County at  (41.1353022, -75.9044749). The CDP extends north to Solomon Gap, which separates Penobscot Knob to the west from Haystack Mountain to the east. To the south, the CDP includes the settlements of Fairview Heights, Wech Corners, Rita, Albert, Rippletown, and Lindbergh. The ridge of Nescopeck Mountain is in the southeast part of the CDP.

The Mountain Top CDP is within the Susquehanna River watershed. The village center sits on a drainage divide between Solomon Creek, which flows north through Solomon Gap to the Susquehanna near Wilkes-Barre, and Big Wapwallopen Creek, which flows to the southwest to the Susquehanna at Wapwallopen. Consequently, even though regional railroads are much diminished in scope and influence, Mountain Top Yard, once used as a marshaling yard at the top of the Ashley Planes funicular (cable-driven) railway, is still an important regional element of the transportation infrastructure connecting Allentown and Philadelphia with points north and west via trackage to several yards in New York state.

The central village of Mountain Top sits at  just south of Penobscot Mountain.

Demographics

As of the census of 2019, there were 11,489 people, which is a slight increase from 10,701 people in 2011. 5,556 households, and 4,394 families residing in the CDP. The population density was 224.0 people per square mile (86.5/km2). There were 5,774 housing units at an average density of 84.7/sq mi (32.7/km2). The racial makeup of the CDP was 97.02% White, 0.54% African American, 0.03% Native American, 1.62% Asian,  0.24% from other races, and 0.56% from two or more races. Hispanic or Latino of any race were 1.08% of the population.

There were 5,556 households, out of which 36.8% had children under the age of 18 living with them, 68.2% were married couples living together, 8.1% had a female householder with no husband present, and 20.9% were non-families. 18.4% of all households were made up of individuals, and 8.5% had someone living alone who was 65 years of age or older. The average household size was 2.72 and the average family size was 3.10.

In the CDP, the population was spread out, with 26.0% under the age of 18, 6.0% from 18 to 24, 28.7% from 25 to 44, 25.7% from 45 to 64, and 13.6% who were 65 years of age or older. The median age was 39 years. For every 100 females, there were 95.5 males. For every 100 females age 18 and over, there were 92.9 males.

The median income for a household in the CDP was $51,655, and the median income for a family was $58,588. Males had a median income of $41,271 versus $26,346 for females. The per capita income for the CDP was $22,480. About 2.9% of families and 3.4% of the population were below the poverty line, including 3.7% of those under age 18 and 5.4% of those age 65 or over.

Education
This area includes Dennison Township, Dorrance Township, Fairview Township, Nuangola Borough, Rice Township, Slocum Township, White Haven Borough, Wright Township, and Penn Lake Borough.

The Crestwood School District consists of four schools:
Rice Elementary School - Rice Township (Grades K-6). 
Fairview Elementary School - Fairview Township (Grades K-6)
Crestwood Middle School - Wright Township (Grades 7 and 8) 
Crestwood High School - Wright Township (Grades 9-12).

St. Jude's Catholic School, in Wright Township, serves grades K-8, after which students can continue Catholic education by attending Holy Redeemer High School in Wilkes-Barre.

References

External links
Crestwood School District
Mountaintop Eagle newspaper

Census-designated places in Luzerne County, Pennsylvania
Census-designated places in Pennsylvania